Chaudhry Iftikhar Hussain (1946 – 6 June 2015) was a Pakistani jurist who served as the 36th Chief Justice of Lahore High Court from 2002 to 2007.

Early life and family
Hussain was born in 1946 in Dina Jhelum. He received his early education from Lahore and Jhelum. He graduated in law from Punjab University Law College in 1970.

He belonged to the influential political family of Jhelum. His brother Chaudhry Altaf Hussain served as Governor of Punjab, Pakistan. Another brother, Chaudhry Shahbaz Hussain is a former federal minister. His nephew Fawad Chaudhry is currently a member of Pakistan Tehreek-e-Insaf and heads Ministry of Science and Technology (Pakistan).  He was relegated to this position from Ministry of Information & Broadcasting (Pakistan) which he headed for just six months before being replaced by Dr. Firdous Ashiq Awan.

Career
He started his practice as a lawyer of Lahore High Court in 1979.

In 1994, he was appointed as the judge of Lahore High Court and was confirmed on confirmed 5 June 1995.

He took oath on Provisional Constitutional Order (PCO) and was appointed Chief Justice of Lahore High Court on 7 September 2002 by Pervaiz Musharraf where he served till 12 December 2007.

References

1946 births
2015 deaths
Pakistani lawyers
Pakistani jurists
Chief Justices of the Lahore High Court
People from Jhelum
Punjab University Law College alumni
Chaudhry family (Jhelum)